The 2020–21 Providence Friars men's basketball team represented Providence College during the 2020–21 NCAA Division I men's basketball season. The team was led by tenth-year head coach Ed Cooley, and played their home games at Alumni Hall in Providence, Rhode Island as a member of the Big East Conference. They finished the season 13-13, 9-10 in Big East Play to finish in 6th place. They lost in the first round of the Big East tournament to DePaul.

Roster

Schedule and results

|-
!colspan=12 style=|Non-conference regular season

|-
!colspan=12 style=|Big East regular season

|-
!colspan=9 style="|Big East tournament

References

Providence Friars men's basketball seasons
Providence Friars
Providence Friars men's basketball
Providence Friars men's basketball